Abramovka is a rural locality (a khutor) in Starostanichnoye Rural Settlement of Kamensky District, Rostov Oblast, Russia. The population was 790 as of 2010. There are 89 streets.

Geography 
Abramovka is located 20 km south of Gluboky (the district's administrative centre) by road. Dichensky is the nearest rural locality.

References 

Rural localities in Rostov Oblast